Aleksandar "Saša" Kovačević (born 27 July 1985) is a Serbian pop-folk singer.

Discography

Albums
Jedina si vredela (2006)
 Korak do dna
 Kada nisu tu
 Jedina si vredela
 Jasno k'o dan
 Ruka za spas
 Lagala me il' ne lagala
 Pakao i raj
 Ostavi me
 Ne umem sa njom

Ornament (2010)
 Ludak
 Kome da verujem
 Ponosna na nas
 Mila
 Tišina
 Moje poslednje
 Kako sada sam
 Ornament
 Još ti se nadam (feat. Emina Jahović)
 Lažu te
 Bolji čovek

Singles 
Idemo do mene  (2011) (marketing. Nikolina Pišek)
Bežimo iz grada (2011)
Kako posle nas  (2011)
Lapsus (2012)
Piši propalo (2013)
Slučajno (2013)
Nothing but the faith (2013)
Mogli smo sve (2014)
Branim (2014)
Noć do podne (2014)
Gde smo moja ljubavi (2015)
Rano Je (2015)
Rođendan (2015)
Živim da te volim (2016)
Zamalo tvoj (2016)
Temperatura (2016)
Temperatura (2017) Spanish Version
Kažeš ne (2017)
Dices no (2017) Spanish Version
Bez tebe me nema (2018)
Jedra (2018)
Prevarena (2019)
Pantera (2020)
Cerquita (2020) Spanish Version
Moja malena (2020)
Afera (2020)
Mala (2020) Spanish Version

References

 3. Saša Kovačević predstavio novu pesmu “Afera” - Toxic TV

External links

 

1985 births
Singers from Belgrade
21st-century Serbian male singers
Serbian pop singers
Living people